Mrčajevci is a village in the city of Čačak, Serbia. It is located in Central Serbian region of Šumadija.

According to the 2011 census, the village has a population of 2,767 inhabitants.

Excavations of pre-historic tumuli has been unearthed in the village.

See also 
 Miroslav Ilić	
 Obren Pjevović
 Tatomir Anđelić

References

Populated places in Moravica District